A template is a device used by sanctioning body officials to check the body shape and height of racing vehicles. The template is used to check that teams have manufactured the sheet metal used in the vehicle bodies to within tight tolerances (up to thousandths of an inch).

NASCAR use
NASCAR cars are checked before qualifying, before racing, sometimes after a race. 

The process of checking car body against templates changed significantly with the Car of Tomorrow (CoT). Before the change, there were different templates applied to each car model to make sure it resembled the factory version of the car. The differing templates frequently caused NASCAR to adjust the templates to ensure that all makes of cars were as aerodynamically equal as possible (called "parity"). There were at least 30 templates used. 

All Car of Tomorrow models utilize the same templates, since the CoT is designed to not resemble a specific street car. All makes of cars have the same specifications for their bodies. Instead of a series of templates, a single one-piece template is mounted to the frame by NASCAR officials.

References

insiderracingnews.com/JF/010504.html; Article on NASCAR templates; Inaccessible 15 February 2008
Body article on howstuffworks.com

Auto racing equipment